Giovanni Spinola (31 July 1935 – 19 October 2020) was an Italian rowing coxswain who had his best achievements in the coxed fours. In this event he won a silver medal at the 1964 Summer Olympics and a bronze at the 1964 European Championships.

References

1935 births
2020 deaths
Italian male rowers
Coxswains (rowing)
Olympic rowers of Italy
Rowers at the 1964 Summer Olympics
Olympic silver medalists for Italy
Olympic medalists in rowing
Medalists at the 1964 Summer Olympics
European Rowing Championships medalists
Sportspeople from the Province of Como